Christopher Paul Edmondson (born 25 June 1950) is a British Anglican retired bishop. He was the Bishop of Bolton, a suffragan bishop in the Diocese of Manchester, from 2008 to 2016.  He is presently an Honorary Assistant Bishop in the Diocese of Leeds.

Early life and education
Edmondson was born on 25 June 1950. He was educated at St John's College, Durham University.

Ordained ministry
Edmondson was ordained in 1974 and began his ecclesiastical career with a curacy at Kirkheaton. From 1979 until 1986 he was Vicar of Ovenden, and also in the latter part of his Incumbency the Bishop of Wakefield's adviser on Evangelism. After further pastoral posts he became Warden of Lee Abbey, Lynton, Devon, in 2002.  This lead in turn to elevation to the suffragan bishopric of Bolton on the retirement of David Gillett. He since became chair of the Scargill Movement — a position he still holds.

Episcopal ministry
Edmondson was consecrated on 25 April 2008 at York Minster and installed at Manchester Cathedral two days later. Both ceremonies were shared with Mark Davies, Bishop of Middleton (his fellow suffragan in the diocese). Between the retirement of Nigel McCulloch on 17 January 2013 and David Walker's confirmation on 7 October 2013, Edmondson and Davies were (co-equally) acting Bishops of Manchester. On 31 October 2015, Edmondson announced that he would retire as Bishop of Bolton on 30 June 2016.

Styles
The Reverend Chris Edmondson (1974–2008)
The Right Reverend Chris Edmondson (2008–present)

References

1950 births
Living people
Alumni of St John's College, Durham
Bishops of Bolton
Alumni of Cranmer Hall, Durham